A number of controversies have arisen as the result of the publishing of cartoons in magazines or newspapers:
 Jyllands-Posten Muhammad cartoons controversy, 2005
 Iran newspaper cockroach cartoon controversy, 2006
 Rakyat Merdeka dingo cartoon controversy, a controversy over the 2006 West Papuan refugee crisis
 2007 Bangladesh cartoon controversy
 Lars Vilks Muhammad drawings controversy
 Rape of Lady Justice cartoon controversy, 2008

See also
 Cartoon war (disambiguation)
 Political cartoon

Cartooning